Le Tremblay-Omonville is a commune in the Eure department in Normandy in northern France. In 2008, it had a population of 287.

Population

See also
Communes of the Eure department

References

Communes of Eure